Te Mata is a small village on the western coast of the Coromandel Peninsula, New Zealand, located approximately halfway between Coromandel Town and Thames. It overlooks Te Mata River.

The name 'Te Mata' also applies to a hamlet on the other side of the Waikato, 15 km from Raglan and a vineyard and a peak in Hawke's Bay.

Demographics 
Te Mata's meshblock (1056201, which includes the whole catchment) had these census results -

References 

Thames-Coromandel District
Populated places in Waikato
Populated places around the Firth of Thames